Bob Arnold was an actor who played the part of Tom Forrest in the long running BBC radio series The Archers. He died in 1998.

Notes

The Archers
English male radio actors
1998 deaths
Year of birth missing